The 1994–95 Wessex Football League was the ninth season of the Wessex Football League. The league champions for the first time in their history were Fleet Town, who were promoted to the Southern League. Founder members Horndean finished bottom and were relegated.

For sponsorship reasons, the league was known as the Jewson Wessex League.

League table
The league consisted of one division of 22 clubs, reduced from the 23 that started the previous season, after Sholing Sports resigned, Whitchurch United were relegated and one new club joined:
Cowes Sports, joining from the Hampshire League.

References

Wessex Football League seasons
9